Jabrun is a commune in the département of Cantal and Auvergne region in south-central France.

Population

See also
Communes of the Cantal department

References

Communes of Cantal
Cantal communes articles needing translation from French Wikipedia